10th Anniversary Live at Nippon Budokan is a live DVD by Japanese duo Every Little Thing, released on August 8, 2007, by Avex Trax.

This footage was taken from the 2-day concert held at the Nippon Budokan on March 6 and 7, 2007, in celebration of their tenth anniversary in the music industry. 

Every Little Thing is a Japanese duo formed in 1996, consisting of members Kaori Mochida (Vocalist) and Ichiro Ito (Guitarist). They debuted with their first release single called "Feel My Heart" in August 1996. 

The DVD also includes behind-the-scenes clips documenting the making of the concert.

Track listing

References

2007 live albums
Every Little Thing (band) albums
 Albums recorded at the Nippon Budokan